Howard Elliott may refer to:
 Howard Elliott (railroad executive) (1860–1928), president of Northern Pacific Railway, and president of New York, New Haven and Hartford Railroad
 Howard Elliott (Missouri politician), lawyer and Republican politician from Missouri
 Howard Leslie Elliott (1877–1956), New Zealand Baptist minister, sectarian agitator and editor
 Howard R. Elliott, U.S. railroad executive and Administrator of the Pipeline and Hazardous Materials Safety Administration